Loevinger is a Jewish surname. Notable people with the surname include:

Jane Loevinger (1918–2008), American psychologist 
Lee Loevinger (1913–2004), American jurist and lawyer

See also
Levinger
Loevinger's stages of ego development

Jewish surnames